Denis Abdulahi (born 22 May 1990) is a professional football player from Finland. His natural position is defense midfield, but he can play in other positions too.

Early life
He was born on 22 May 1990 in Kosovska Mitrovica, SFR Yugoslavia.

Career

FC Viikingit
On 16 May 2009, Abdulahi made his senior debut for the second-tier club. He showed immediate success in midfield. During the start year of 2010, he also made his international debut for Finland's U21 team.

Örebro SK
On 30 July 2010, Örebro SK announced that they had signed Abdulahi on a long-term contract. The lad had a trial with the club in the mid of June 2010 and the club decided to sign him after making a good trial. While signing for Örebro SK, he was described as a dynamic defense midfielder with great working capacity and much potential.

Vikingur Reykjavik 
In the 2011 season Denis played against Knattspyrnufelag Vesturbæjar in the Visa Cup. Denis was sent off for head butting Arnar Smarason (AKA Kaiser) who was wearing a buff on the pitch. He received a 2 match ban for this horrendous incident. Denis was never the same player afterwards and some people say that Smarason was the reason why his career never went off.

References

External links
 

Finnish footballers
Finland under-21 international footballers
Finnish expatriate footballers
Örebro SK players
Vaasan Palloseura players
Allsvenskan players
Veikkausliiga players
Expatriate footballers in Sweden
Expatriate footballers in Iceland
Finnish expatriate sportspeople in Sweden
Finnish expatriate sportspeople in Iceland
Knattspyrnufélagið Víkingur players
Association football midfielders
1990 births
Living people
Finnish people of Albanian descent
Kosovan emigrants to Finland
FC Viikingit players